Mohammad Shajari (born 30 August 1991) is an Iranian professional futsal player. He is currently a member of Giti Pasand in the Iranian Futsal Super League.

Honours

Country 
 AFC Futsal Championship
 Champion (1): 2018
 Runners-up (1): 2014
 Asian Indoor Games
 Champion (1): 2017

Club 
 AFC Futsal Club Championship
 Runners-up (1): 2019 (Mes Sungun)
 Iranian Futsal Super League
 Runners-up (1): 2017–18 (Tasisat Daryaei) - 2018–19 (Giti Pasand)

International goals

References 

1991 births
Living people
People from Saveh
Iranian men's futsal players
Shahrdari Saveh FSC players
Melli Haffari FSC players
Tasisat Daryaei FSC players
Giti Pasand FSC players
Mes Sungun FSC players